Yun Yong-ho (born 10 July 1965) is a South Korean rower. He competed in the men's coxless four event at the 1988 Summer Olympics.

References

1965 births
Living people
South Korean male rowers
Olympic rowers of South Korea
Rowers at the 1988 Summer Olympics
Place of birth missing (living people)